Jacob J. Hinlopen (1582 – 1629 in Amsterdam) lived in a house with Hinlopen in the gable, now at 155 Nieuwendijk. He traded in cloth and Indian wares. In 1602 he was co-founder of the Dutch East India Company in Enkhuizen: his descendants inherited very old stocks. In 1617 he became the first person of Flemish origin to obtain a seat on the City Council.

Jacob J. Hinlopen father 
Jacob J. Hinlopen became a friend of Joost van den Vondel, at that time also an Arminian. His wife was Sara de Wael (1591–1652), the daughter of a Haarlem burgomaster, beer brewer, and investor in the new development, the Lastage. The couple inhabited Herengracht 130, a double-wide mansion.

His brother Frans traded with Angola; his brother Tijmen, for whom the Hinlopen Strait on Svalbard was named, was the director of the Noordsche Company and traded with Russia. His brother-in-law, Jan de Wael, burgomaster of Haarlem like his father, was imprisoned for some weeks in 1650 in Loevestein Castle with Jacob de Witt, before the raid on Amsterdam by stadholder William II of Orange.

Jacob J. Hinlopen, son 
After the death of their mother, the two sons inherited the mansion, designed by Philips Vingboons. Today Pijnenburg in the surroundings of Soest is still the largest domain in private possession.  The ancestral house near the harbour was sold. The brothers bought lots in the Jordaan, hired a carpenter, and speculated in the construction of cheap houses.

Jacob became commissioner of the Desolate Boedelkamer (Chamber of Insolvent Estates) and was involved in the selling of Rembrandt possessions and the inheritance of Titus van Rijn, the son of Rembrandt.

Like his brother Jan, Jacob J. Hinlopen (1621–1679) is also known as a collector of paintings, including a Samson, and The Woman Taken in Adultery, both by Rembrandt. The latter work was bought in 1657 for 1500 guilders at auction from Johannes de Renialme, an art trader. It was, at that time, held in higher regard than any other work by Rembrandt.

Jacob lived on the Kloveniersburgwal, opposite Jan Six, who was related to his wife, Anna Tholinx. Jacob J. Hinlopen was, until his death, tutor to Johanna Maria and Sara, the two children of his brother Jan J. Hinlopen. After his burial, the paintings formerly belonging to his brother were assigned by lot to his nieces.

Jacob J. Hinlopen, grandson 
Jacob J. Hinlopen (1644–1705) married Deborah Popta. This Jacob had very many functions, among which director of the VOC, schout and burgomaster. He moved in 1680 to Golden Bend, in a house which is now the Goethe Institute. He was the owner of renowned Rembrandt The Storm on the Sea of Galilee. The fairly large painting was stolen in 1990 from a museum in Boston.

Sources

External links 
 Hinlopen Street, Spitsbergen
  On domain Pijnenburg
 Rembrandt: Christ and the Woman Taken in Adultery (1644)
 FBI top ten Art crimes
  Elvin Post behandelt in Vals beeld de kunstroof

1582 births
1629 deaths
Art collectors from Amsterdam
17th-century Dutch businesspeople
17th-century merchants
Businesspeople from Amsterdam